CJMU-FM, is a Canadian radio station which broadcasts country music at 102.3 MHz (FM) in Bracebridge/Gravenhurst, Ontario. The station is branded as Country 102.

History
On October 7, 2016, Bayshore Broadcasting Corporation received CRTC to operate a new English language commercial FM radio station at Bracebridge/Gravenhurst on the frequency of 102.3 MHz with an average effective radiated power (ERP) of 22,000 watts.  The station would broadcast a country music format.

On May 10, 2018, the CRTC approved Bayshore's license to increase the effective radiated power (ERP) from 22,000 to 23,000 watts and decreasing the effective height of the antenna above average terrain from 69.5 to 65 metres.

CJMU-FM began testing at 102.3 MHz in June 2018 and officially signed on August 7 that same year as Muskoka's Best Country - Country 102.

References

External links
www.country102.ca
CJMU-FM history - Canadian Communications Foundation

Jmu
Bracebridge, Ontario
Jmu
Radio stations established in 2018
2018 establishments in Ontario